The thirteen-lined ground squirrel (Ictidomys tridecemlineatus), also known as the striped gopher, leopard ground squirrel, and squinney (formerly known as the leopard-spermophile in the age of Audubon), is a ground squirrel that is widely distributed over grasslands and prairies of North America.

Description 

It is brownish, with 13 alternating brown and whitish longitudinal lines (sometimes partially broken into spots) on its back and sides, creating rows of whitish spots within dark lines.

Taxonomy 
This species has usually been placed in the genus Spermophilus with about 40 other species. As this large genus is paraphyletic to prairie dogs, marmots, and antelope squirrels, Kristofer Helgen and colleagues have split it into eight genera, placing the thirteen-lined ground squirrel in Ictidomys with two other species.

Behavior 
The thirteen-lined ground squirrel is strictly diurnal and is especially active on warm days. A solitary or only somewhat colonial hibernator, it often occurs in aggregations in suitable habitats.

In late summer, it puts on a heavy layer of fat and stores some food in its burrow. It enters its nest in October (some adults retire much earlier), rolls into a stiff ball, and decreases its respiration from between 100 and 200 breaths per minute to one breath about every five minutes. It emerges in March or early April.

Most of the burrow is within one to two feet (about half a meter) of the surface, with only the hibernation nest in a special deeper section. Shorter burrows are dug as hiding places. This ground squirrel's home range is two to three acres (0.8 to 1.2 ha).
 
Its primary diet includes grass and weed seeds, caterpillars, grasshoppers, and crickets, but it may also eat mice and shrews; it will viciously attack and consume cicadas if able to catch them. This squirrel sometimes damages gardens by digging burrows and eating vegetables, but also devours weed seeds and harmful insects.

It is well known for standing upright to survey its domain, diving down into its burrow when it senses danger, then sometimes poking out its nose and giving a bird-like trill. The "trill" is an alarm call that is most often used by females to warn nearby relatives.

The thirteen-lined ground squirrels have solitary habits, shown by agonistic behaviors to squirrels invading their own areas, which they've evolved, requiring less energy and the risk of getting injuired. Tail-flicking is also evolved from their solitary habits, which allows them not to violate other squirrel individuals' space.

Physiology 
Thirteen-lined ground squirrels can survive in hibernation for over six months without food or water and special physiological adaptations allow them to do so.  During torpor, these squirrels maintain hydration by redistributing and storing osmolytes like sodium, glucose, and blood urea nitrogen in different body compartments (to be identified).  When they enter a transient active-like state, small periods of arousal where these squirrels return to an active-like state temporarily, osmolarity and antidiuretic hormone levels rise while thirst remains suppressed.   Thirteen-lined ground squirrels also suppress the cell cycle and control the expression of cell cycle regulators in the liver during hibernation to conserve energy. Moreover, they are able to maintain their muscle contractile performance during hibernation. Although scientists determined that there is a reduction in the squirrels' muscle mass during torpor, this does not significantly change the muscles' contractile properties. During hibernation, thirteen-lined ground squirrels prioritize skeletal muscle tissue for maintenance and potential regrowth. They also increase their muscle antioxidant capacity during torpor to protect tissue from oxidative damage associated with the restoration of blood flow during the transition period from torpor to arousal. During hibernation, they mobilize fatty acids for fuel instead of glycogen, which is kept constant during hibernation. During their active-like state, they are able to resume their cell cycle.

See also
Golden-mantled ground squirrel
Chipmunk an animal with a similar appearance of stripes

References

External links

 Thirteen-lined Ground Squirrel Genome Project page at GenBank
 If you know what a "squinny" is, you're probably from Des Moines

View the squirrel genome in Ensembl
 

Mammals of the United States
Fauna of the Plains-Midwest (United States)
Fauna of the Great Lakes region (North America)
Ictidomys
Mammals of Canada
Mammals described in 1821
Taxa named by Samuel L. Mitchill